Susanna Leveson-Gower, Marchioness of Stafford (née Lady Susanna Stewart) (1742–1805), styled Lady Susanna Stewart from 1742 to 1768, Countess Gower until 1786, Marchioness of Stafford until 1803 and Dowager Marchioness of Stafford until her death in 1805, was a British noblewoman, who in 1768 became the wife of Granville Leveson-Gower, 1st Marquess of Stafford and a member of the Leveson-Gower family.

Family
Lady Susanna was born in 1742 in Scotland, the eldest daughter of Alexander Stewart, 6th Earl of Galloway by his second wife, the former Lady Catherine Cochrane, herself the youngest daughter of the 4th Earl of Dundonald. She had an older half-sister, Lady Mary Stewart, wife of Kenneth Mackenzie, Lord Fortrose, from her father's first marriage to Lady Anne Keith.
 
In 1761 she became a Maid of the Bedchamber to Princess Augusta of Great Britain.

Marriage and issue

In 1768 she married as his third wife Granville Leveson-Gower, 1st Marquess of Stafford, then known as The Earl Gower. After her husband was awarded the title of Marquess of Stafford in 1786, she was styled Marchioness of Stafford.

They lived at Trentham Hall, Staffordshire and had four children:

Lady Georgiana Augusta Leveson-Gower (13 Apr 1769 - 24 March 1806), who married William Eliot, 2nd Earl of St Germans.
Lady Charlotte Sophia Leveson-Gower (b.c.12 Feb 1771, St Martin In The Fields, Westminster - 12 August 1854), who married Henry Somerset, 6th Duke of Beaufort and was mother of Henry Somerset, 7th Duke of Beaufort and Lord Granville Somerset.
Lady Susanna Leveson-Gower (b.c.15 Sep 1772, Trentham - 26 May 1838), who married Dudley Ryder, 1st Earl of Harrowby.
Granville Leveson-Gower, 1st Earl Granville (b.c.5 Nov 1773, Trentham – 8 January 1846).
Lord Stafford died at Trentham Hall, Staffordshire, on 26 Oct 1803, aged 82. Susanna, Dowager Marchioness of Stafford, died in Stafford-street, Mayfair, on 15  Aug 1805, aged 63.

References

British marchionesses
Daughters of Scottish earls
1805 deaths
1742 births